Being A Good Daddy, also called Good Daddy, The Daddy I Like or Because I Like You (the literal translation from Korean), was a South Korean reality variety show. Originally having been just a Chuseok show, it became a permanent weekly show after favourable reviews of its pilot episode.

Summary
Five male celebrities of different ages and talents are gathered together to take care of a daughter, each sharing the role of parenting as well as dealing with issues such as education (parent-teacher meetings) and outings.

The show was hosted by the then 2-year-old Moon Mason, and although he could not talk yet, he guided them through the show with missions to do with their daughter.

Cast 
 Daddies
Kim Gun-mo
Kim Hyeong-beom
Yoo Se-yoon
Kim Hee-chul (Super Junior)
Lee Hongki (F.T. Island)
 Daughters
Lee Hyo-jung (pilot to episode 5)
Yoon Jung-eun (episodes 6 to 12)

Episodes and rating
In the ratings below, the highest rating for the show will be in red, and the lowest rating for the show will be in blue.

References

 Good Daddy homepage

Seoul Broadcasting System original programming
South Korean reality television series
2008 South Korean television series debuts
2009 South Korean television series endings